Penrhiw Priory was originally built as a vicarage in St Davids, Pembrokeshire, Wales, in 1884. The building was enlarged in the 1960s, serving for a time as a priory. In 2008 The Retreats Group Trust bought the building and commissioned Acanthus Holden Architects it undertake its conversion into a hotel. Then in 2012, Penrhiw Priory reopened as an eight-bedroom hotel restored along with Roch Castle and Twr y Felin Hotel, by the Griffiths Roch Foundation, which was set up in 2009 by international architect Keith Griffiths. It is a Grade-II listed building.

Penrhiw Priory’s Garden Bedroom is the bedroom of the vicar who was placed here by the Church in Wales in 1882 to stem the migration to non-conformist chapels. The stables housed his horses and carriage to enable him to reach the parishioners to entice them back to the church. The Coach House now houses Meadow Suite on the ground floor and Court, above on the first floor.

References

Buildings and structures completed in 1884
St Davids
Grade II listed buildings in Pembrokeshire